This is a list of commercial Long-Term Evolution (LTE) networks around the world, grouped by their frequency bands.

Some operators use multiple bands and are therefore listed multiple times in respective sections.

General information 
 For technical details on LTE and a list of its designated operating frequencies, bands, and roaming possibilities, see LTE frequency bands.
 Bands 33 to 53 are assigned to TDD-LTE.

Note: This list of network deployments does not imply any widespread deployment or national coverage.

Africa 
See List of LTE networks in Africa.

Americas

Caribbean

French Overseas Territories (CEPT band plan)

Central and South America (APT band plan)

Belize, Bolivia, Canada (FCC band plan) 

Canada: Bell Network Availability within Tier 3 License Areas

United States and US Territories  (FCC band plan) 

Apart from their main spectrum holdings across large regions in the country (listed below) the major US carriers (AT&T, Sprint, T-Mobile & Verizon) also hold various Cellular Market Area (CMA) and/or Economic Area (EA) licenses for the AWS 1700 band, as well as Major Trading Area (MTA) and/or Basic Trading Area (BTA) licenses for the PCS 1900 band. In several small regional areas the named operators combine these with their major spectrum holdings to increase the bandwidth for their LTE deployments. Due to the large amount of these "single" licenses they are not listed here.

Third-party users of U.S. LTE networks and spectrum sublessees

Asia 
See List of LTE networks in Asia.

Europe 
See List of LTE networks in Europe.

Oceania

See also 
 LTE
 LTE frequency bands
 List of planned LTE networks
 List of 5G NR networks
 List of UMTS networks
 List of HSPA+ networks
 List of CDMA2000 networks
 List of mobile network operators

References 

Lists by country
LTE (telecommunication)
Telecommunications lists